Husbands in Goa  is a 2012 Malayalam comedy film directed by Saji Surendran and written by Krishna Poojapura, starring Jayasurya, Indrajith, Asif Ali, Lal, Rima Kallingal, Bhama, Remya Nambeesan and Praveena.

The film follows the journey of three young men, who flee from their wives, for a vacation to the international tourist-destination Goa. During the trip, they become friends with an immature youthful older man, who is on the verge of a divorce. The film explores their time in Goa, the people they meet and a turn of events occur when they encounter their wives. The film is the second production of UTV Motion Pictures in Malayalam cinema. It features music composed by M. G. Sreekumar, whilst cinematography is handled by Anil Nair and is edited by Manoj. The film's plot was heavily inspired by the 2004 Hindi film Masti.

Plot
Three husbands Govind (Jayasurya), Jerry (Indrajith) and Arjun (Asif Ali) are on a trip to Goa to take a break from their messy married lives with their dominating wives Teena (Rima Kallingal), Abhirami (Bhama) and Veena (Remya Nambeesan). During the trip, they meet a husband Sunny (Lal) who is on the verge of a divorce, which becomes a turning point in their lives. Their vacation in Goa, how they hook up with three young ladies and how their wives come to know about it, forms the rest of the movie.

Cast
Jayasurya as Murali Govind, a chartered accountant
Indrajith as Jerry Thomas, a family lawyer
Asif Ali as Arjun, an interior designer
Lal as Sunny Abraham, a film cinematographer
Bhama as Abhirami, Govind's wife
Rima Kallingal as Tina, Jerry's wife
Remya Nambeesan as Veena, Arjun's wife
Praveena as Annie, Sunny's estranged wife
Kalabhavan Mani as Imran Khalid, a police officer
Innocent as Nadar (TTE)
 Amaeya Sivadas
Suraj Venjaramoodu as Vasu Kollanjampally (Vasco)
Sarayu Mohan as Saniya
Divya Padmini as Rita
Unni Maya as Jessica
Leena Maria Paul as Jennifer
Noby Marcose, of Vodafone Comedy stars Fame, as himself 
Nelson Sooranadu of Vodafone Comedy stars Fame, as a waiter in a hotel

Actor Innocent reprises his role as Nadar (TTE) from the 1990 movie No.20 Madras Mail. Events of the movie are briefly referenced. The song "Pichakappoonkaavukal" from the movie is also reused.

Development
Even before the release of his fourth directorial venture Kunjaliyan, director Saji Surendran mentioned that he was going to direct his next project very soon: Husbands in Goa. He also revealed that it would be produced by the famous production company
UTV Motion Pictures.  The film was known to be the sequel of Happy Husbands but the director said himself this is not a sequel but a similar fun-filled film. It had been announced that the film will be produced by UTV Motion Pictures because of the production company wanted to expand and produce a second well made film in Malayalam after Grandmaster.

Casting
The director had announced that Jayasurya, Indrajith and Asif Ali will be the official confirmed cast.
Biju Menon was originally chosen to play Lal role, but couldn't because date-clash. Also Bhavana, and Samvritha Sunil were announced to be part of the cast, but could not do so because of date-clash. Then they had later decided to cast Bhama, Rima Kallingal, Remya Nambeesan and Praveena to play the wives. Newcomer Leena Maria and Sarayu were chosen to play the girls that distract the husbands.

Critical reception
The movie opened to Positive to mixed response from both critics and audiences.
Theatre Balcony gave an overall rating of 66% and praised the comedy scenes and the performances while disliking the not so engaging story and script.
Metromatinee gave a positive review and said " If you are one of those who watch mimicry and comedy shows on TV, this movie will help you relive those moments that you spent in front of TV."
The Times of India gave a very positive review and rated 3 stars out of 5. But added that "The film evokes hilarity, but the humour fails to generate the rip-roaring laugh one associates with a comedy."
Kerala Films welcomed the movie giving 2.5 stars out of 5 and said "Husbands in Goa really deserves a one time watch, especially for the exceptional lead performances, great comedy scenes, racy direction, and the song 'Pichakal poomkavukal'."
Critics have noted actor Jayasurya's performance to be the best, also stating he is the show stealer in the film because of him having perfect comic timing and getting many positive replies from audiences.
However, the film also got some negative reviews from the critics. Sify gave a negative review and gave 2 stars out of 5 and added "You need real skills to find humour in 'Husbands in Goa'. Go for this one, if you are ready to take such pains."
Paresh C Palicha of Rediff.com said that Husbands in Goa is a typical 'husbands escaping from their wives' attempt at comedy which elicits a few laughs.

Box office
The film collected 10,135 from UK box office.

Soundtrack

The soundtrack features four songs composed by M. G. Sreekumar with lyrics by Shibu Chakravarthy and Rajeev Alunkal. The songs had nothing much to offer but the remake song "Pichaka Poonkavukal" that was a part of Joshiy's No.20 Madras Mail, rocked the charts.

References

External links
 

Indian comedy films
2012 comedy films
2012 films
2010s Malayalam-language films
Films set in Goa
Films shot in Goa
Films shot in Kochi
UTV Motion Pictures films
Films directed by Saji Surendran